The 2020 BetVictor World Cup of Darts was the tenth edition of the PDC World Cup of Darts. It took place behind closed doors from 6–8 November 2020 at the Salzburgarena in Salzburg, Austria. The event was originally due to be held between 18–21 June 2020 at the Barclaycard Arena in Hamburg, Germany, but was postponed and relocated due to the COVID-19 pandemic. It was also relocated away from a second planned venue of the Premstättner Halle in Graz.

Scotland were the defending champions, after defeating the Irish team of William O'Connor and Steve Lennon 3–1 in the 2019 final,  Peter Wright and Gary Anderson did not defend the title for Scotland this year, as both withdrew from taking part due to the COVID-19 pandemic, and were replaced by John Henderson and Robert Thornton, making Scotland the first defending champions of this tournament to be unseeded at the following tournament. The new-look Scotland team were beaten 2–1 by Wales in the second round.

Wales, represented by Gerwyn Price and Jonny Clayton, won their first World Cup of Darts title by defeating the English team of Michael Smith and Rob Cross 3–0 in the final.

Format
The tournament remained at 32 teams this year, with the top 8 teams being seeded and the remaining 24 teams being unseeded in the first round. As with recent years, the tournament is a straight knockout.

First round: Best of nine legs doubles.
Second round, quarter and semi-finals: Two best of seven legs singles matches. If the scores are tied, a best of seven legs doubles match will settle the match.
Final: Three points needed to win the title. Two best of seven legs singles matches are played, followed by a best of seven doubles match. If necessary, one or two best of seven legs singles matches in reverse order are played to determine the champion.

Prize money
Total prize money remained at £350,000.

The prize money per team was:

Teams and seedings
All the countries that participated at the 2019 event returned for the 2020 event, although notably owing to the changes of personnel in their teams, neither Scotland nor Australia will be seeded at this tournament for the very first time. On 18 October, the Philippines expressed concerns due to logistics issue caused by COVID-19 travel restrictions, and have threatened to withdraw, but they were cleared to participate in the end.

On 2 November, Singapore withdrew from the competition as Harith Lim couldn't fly to Austria, because of new regulations in Singapore (whereas his teammate Paul Lim was based in Hong Kong), so they were replaced by Portugal (represented by José de Sousa and José Marquês), while Kim Viljanen, Cristo Reyes and Xicheng Han of Finland, Spain and China respectively, were replaced by Veijo Viinikka, Jesús Noguera and Zizhao Zheng. On the eve of the tournament, the Chinese team of Zizhao Zheng and Di Zhuang were forced to withdraw after issues with their flights to Austria, with standby team Latvia, represented by Madars Razma & Janis Mustafejevs, taking their spot.

The competing nations were confirmed following the conclusion of the 2020 World Grand Prix on 12 October, all players named on the seeded nations are the top 2 of each nation on the PDC Order of Merit, although team selection was subject to change. The Top 8 nations based on combined Order of Merit rankings on 12 October will be seeded.

The teams were officially announced on 15 October:

Seeded nations

Unseeded nations

Results

Draw

Second round
Two best of seven legs singles matches. If the scores were tied, a best of seven legs doubles match settled the match.

Quarter-finals
Two best of seven legs singles matches. If the scores were tied, a best of seven legs doubles match settled the match.

Semi-finals
Two best of seven legs singles matches. If the scores were tied, a best of seven legs doubles match will settle the match.

Final
Three match wins were needed to win the title. Two best of seven legs singles matches followed by a best of seven doubles match. If necessary, one or two best of seven legs reverse singles matches were played to determine the champion.

References

2020
World Cup
PDC World Cup of Darts
PDC